"Destiny" is a song by Schiller, with vocals by Despina Vandi. It is included on Schiller's gold album Sehnsucht. On February 22, 2008, "Sehnsucht" by German band Schiller was released in Germany by Sleepingroom, including many collaborations with international stars such as Despina Vandi with the song "Destiny" amongst them. It is the first international collaboration between Despina Vandi and German band Schiller. The song is written and produced by both Phoebus and Schiller.

The song was later also released on Vandi's repackaged CD 10 Hronia Mazi: It's Destiny.

References

2008 singles
Despina Vandi songs
Songs written by Phoebus (songwriter)
2007 songs